The Kuskokwim 300 is among the more highly regarded mid-distance dogsled races in Alaska, annually attracting some of the top mushers in the sport. The race starts and ends on the Kuskokwim River in Bethel, Alaska, and is run on and adjacent to its namesake river.

History
Often referred to as the "Kusko 300", or "K-300", the race has been held every January since 1980 (except 2021 which was held in February), and commemorates an early mail route that once tied the settlements along the river to the outside world. Top mushers and hundreds of sled dogs participate in the race for a purse of $160,000, the largest offered by any 300-mile (480 km) sled dog race.

The race is renowned for its often difficult weather and trail conditions.  The inaugural race saw a fierce blizzard with dangerously low windchills for the first half of the race, followed by a freak thaw and rain for the latter half.  Three separate K-300s (1991, 1999, 2008) earned the nickname "Kusko-Swim", due to strong winds, rain, and deep overflow on top of the river ice.

2021 will see the race be rescheduled for mid-February, avoiding Super Bowl LV.

List of race winners

 1980 - Rick Swenson
 1981 - Jerry Austin
 1982 - Jerry Austin
 1983 - Myron Angstman
 1984 - Rick Swenson
 1985 - Rick Mackey
 1986 - Myron Angstman
 1987 - Rick Mackey
 1988 - Susan Butcher
 1989 - Sonny Russell
 1990 - Sonny Russell
 1991 - Jeff King
 1992 - Jeff King
 1993 - Jeff King
 1994 - Martin Buser  
 1995 - Ramey Smyth
 1996 - Charlie Boulding
 1997 - Jeff King
 1998 - Greg Swingley
 1999 - Doug Swingley
 2000 - Charlie Boulding
 2001 - Jeff King
 2002 - Jeff King
 2003 - Jeff King
 2004 - Ed Iten
 2005 - Mitch Seavey
 2006 - Jeff King
 2007 - Martin Buser
 2008 - Mitch Seavey
 2009 - Mitch Seavey
 2010 - John Baker
 2011 - Paul Gebhardt
 2012 - Rohn Buser
 2013 - Jeff King
 2014 - Rohn Buser
 2015 - Pete Kaiser 
 2016 - Pete Kaiser
 2017 - Pete Kaiser
 2018 - Pete Kaiser
 2019 - Matthew Failor (record time)
 2020 - Pete Kaiser
 2021 - Richie Diehl
 2022 - Pete Kaiser

External links
 
 2010 Kuskokwim 300 results
 "Kotzebue musher Baker pulls away to win Kuskokwim 300", Anchorage Daily News

1980 establishments in Alaska
Annual events in Alaska
Bethel, Alaska
Dog sledding races
Recurring sporting events established in 1980
Sports competitions in Alaska